The Dhaka Dominators (Dhakaiya/) is a franchise cricket team that plays in the Bangladesh Premier League (BPL), representing the country's Dhaka City, Dhaka.

The team was originally established in 2012 for the inaugural BPL season as the Dhaka Gladiators and they won both the 2012 and 2013 editions of the tournament. The Gladiators were one of the teams dissolved in 2013 after the second edition. The franchise was sold to BEXIMCO Group and rebranded as Dhaka Dynamites.

For the 2015 edition of the BPL, the team were coached by former South African cricketer Mickey Arthur, and captained by Kumar Sangakkara. Bangladeshi player Nasir Hossain was selected as the "icon" player of the team.

On 16 November 2019, Jamuna Bank bought the rights to the team and renamed it to Dhaka Platoon.

The team was rebranded Minister Dhaka after changing owners ahead of 2021–22 Bangladesh Premier League.

In September 2022, Pragati Green Auto Rice Mills acquired the ownership rights of the team. But, later they lost ownership as they could not meet the financial requirements. And finally, in November 2022, Rupa Fabrics Limited acquired the ownership rights of the Dhaka team and rebranded as Dhaka Dominators.

Franchise history
Dhaka Dynamites was formed in 2009 as one of the participating teams in the National Cricket League Twenty20. The ownership of the team was acquired by Ahmed Shayan Fazlur Rahman's Beximco Group. The league was later replaced with Bangladesh Premier League, with the ownership of the franchise being awarded to Europa Group under the name of Dhaka Gladiators for US$5.05 million. After multiple corruption charges against the owners, the team was re-acquired by Beximco Group in 2015. Later in 2019 Jamuna Bank acquired the team.

Season history

BPL 01

In the first two seasons, Mashrafe Bin Mortaza captained the team and Ian Pont was the head coach. Dhaka Gladiators started off their campaign disappointingly by losing against an experienced Khulna Royal Bengals which was led by all rounder Shakib Al Hasan. However this was succeeded by three consecutive wins even without players like Shahid Afridi and Saeed Ajmal. During their third victory against Barisal Burners, they made the highest total of the tournament by scoring 208 runs for five wickets. They defended this score, even though Chris Gayle scored a century for the Barisal Burners. Later in the tournament, they failed to chase mediocre targets due to batting collapses. In the final, Dhaka Gladiators beat the Barisal Burners to be crowned champions of BPL 2012.

BPL 02

For the 2012/13 season, Dhaka Gladiators bought all-rounder Shakib Al Hasan who was the most expensive player and the captain in the tournament. They bought fast bowler Mashrafe Mortaza, the emerging wicket keeper Anamul Haque and more. They also bought South African pace bowler Alfonso Thomas,  and West Indians Kieron Pollard and Chris Gayle who were only available for one game. They bought English players Luke Wright, Owais Shah, Darren Stevens, bowler Chris Liddle and batsman Josh Cobb. This team of players were crowned 2013 champions, just as they had been in 2012. They played 14 games, won 11 and lost only 3. This time their strongest opponent was Sylhet Royals.

BPL 03

Dhaka Dynamites was introduced in a new look in 2015. During the player draft, Kumar Sangakkara was selected as the captain while Nasir Hossain was picked as the "icon" player. A total of eighteen players was selected in the draft process. The notable players in and out of the draft they purchased were, Mustafizur Rahman, Yasir Shah, Mohammad Hafeez and Ryan ten Doeschate and Mohammad Irfan

They started off rather smoothly by defeating Comilla Victorians and Chittagong Vikings but lost their way through defeats against Rangpur Riders and Barisal Bulls. Luckily, they finished at 4th place out of 6 teams but lost against the Bulls in the eliminator

BPL 04
 
After having an average season at BPL 3, the Dynamites started the fourth season with a strong team including the likes of Shakib Al Hasan, Andre Russell, Dwayne Bravo, Kumar Sangakkara, Mosaddek Hossain, Evin Lewis, Mahela Jayawardene, Wayne Parnell and Ravi Bopara. They started their campaign with winning against Barisal Bulls. On their way, they were only defeated by the Rajshahi Kings and Khulna Titans. They defeated the Titans in the first qualifier and the Kings in the final, being crowned champions for the third time

Dwayne Bravo became the highest wicket taker of the tournament. While Kumar Sangakkara scored most runs for them.

BPL 05

The team has signed many new foreign players among whom Shahid Afridi, Shane Watson, Mohammad Amir and Sunil Narine are worth mentioning. They retained Md. Shahid, Mosaddek Hossain and Mehedi Maruf from the local category while they retained Kumar Sangakkara, Evin Lewis and Ronsford Beaton from the overseas department. They also extended the contract of ace all-rounder Shakib Al Hasan as their icon player.

They got the second pick in the local and overseas pick in the draft, choosing pacer Abu Hider and English batsman Joe Denly respectively. Their surprise picks were pacers Khaled Ahmed, Mohammad Saddam, batsman Shadman Islam and little-known West Indian orthodox spinner Akeal Hosein.

Dhaka Dynamites had a shaky start with a surprise defeat to Sylhet Sixers. However the team soon bounced back and finished 2nd in the league stage. They crushed Comilla Victorians in Qualifier-1, hence advancing to the final. They didn't manage the defend the title as they suffered a heave defeat to Rangpur Riders in the final who were eventually crowned the champions, securing their maiden trophy.

BPL 06

All the franchises were given until 30 September 2018 to submit their 4 retained cricketers. Dhaka Dynamites retained Shakib Al Hasan, Kieron Pollard, Sunil Narine and Rovman Powell. All Franchises were also allowed to buy 2 foreign players pre-draft but they can't be the ones who played for the team last season. Dhaka Dynamites bought Afghan hard-hitter Hazratullah Zazai and Caribbean all-rounder Andre Russell.

In the draft, Dhaka's first pick was local fast bowler Rubel Hossain. They signed South African bowler Andrew Birch and English batsman Ian Bell as their overseas players in draft. They ended up signing 10 local players in the draft.

In the tournament Dhaka had a flying start winning five matches out of their first six matches. But they suddenly lost their momentum and suffered five consecutive defeats and eventually pipped Rajshahi Kings out of top four by winning their last group match and qualified for Eliminator. In the Eliminator they defeated Chittagong Vikings and defeated Rangpur Riders in the Qualifier 2 to seal their place in the Final. In the final Comilla Victorians set a target of 200 for Dhaka, but they fell short by 17 runs in their chase and Comilla won the tournament for the second time.

Shakib Al Hasan was the highest wicket taker of the season and won the Player of the Tournament for his all-round performances.

BPL 07

The franchise had signed English ODI captain Eoin Morgan who is the winning captain of ICC Cricket World Cup 2019 and South African explosive batsman David Miller as their two direct signings. Shakib Al Hasan, the captain of the franchise for last 3 season, left the team and joined Rangpur Riders.

However, During the player's direct signing period, a Conflict of Interests aroused between BCB and all other franchise. Subsequently, in September 2019, BCB made some changes in rules and regulations for this season and eliminating all franchises, BCB took over the charge of the current BPL and decided to run this current tournament by the board itself and named the tournament as Bangabandhu BPL T20 2019 in order to pay homage to Sheikh Mujibur Rahman on his birth centenary. Jamuna Bank acquired the team's sponsorship rights. They will be known as ‘Jamuna Bank Dhaka Platoon’ and they have signed the likes of Shahid Afridi, Thisara Perera, Tamim Iqbal and Mashrafe Mortaza

Current squad

Seasons

Sponsors

References 

Sport in Dhaka
Cricket clubs established in 2015
Sports clubs in Bangladesh
Bangladesh Premier League teams
Cricket in Dhaka
2015 establishments in Bangladesh